Hinatuan is a second class municipality in the province of Surigao del Sur, Philippines. According to the 2020 census, it has a population of 43,841 people.

Hinatuan is approximately 44 kilometers (27 miles) north of Bislig, a component city in the same province.

History

Pre-Spanish Era

The history of Hinatuan in the annals of historical heritage can be traced back from the time of the Spaniards in this part of Mindanao. The intermingling of tribes such as the Manobos, the Mansakas, Subanons and the Mandayas through assimilation and amalgamation leads to the final unification of a group of people who settled in the old town site known as Da-an Lungsod. Being the first and the earliest settlement, it was later identified as part of the province of Caraga under the administration of the politico - militar of Encomienda Bislig.

The name Hinatuan, originally derived from the word "Hatud" and later called "Hatudan"  was handed down from generation to generation through oral version. These words have two versions - " Hatud " in the native dialect simply known in english as brought. In fact, fishing is the major occupation of the inhabitants. To denote a place, a suffix " an " was added to " Hatud " to become " Hatudan "meaning brought forth.

Spanish Era

The place was used to be a pathway where dead bodies of people being transferred to another place and that's why it called " hinatudan " translates to broughting. Right until
in 1856, the town was transferred to its present site, formerly known as "Hinatudan" now known as Hinatuan as ordered by the higher Spanish authorities. A political government was set up with Raymundo Bandola, the first captain known as defender of the town against the Moro piracy. He was followed by Capitanes Edobigito Lindo, Atanacio de Castro, Tomas Luna, Fernando Nazareno and Teodoro Villaluz. Eugenio Villaluz was accredited the last capitan under the Spanish regime, the first and last captain under the First Philippine Republic, and the first presidential appointee under the American regime. These mentioned capitanes contributed much to the building of the physical set up of the town.

The appointed presidents following Eugenio Villaluz were : Mariano Verano, Pablo Evangelio, Nicomedes Villaluz and Ex-Captain Fernando Nazareno. Domingo Balbuena was the first president - elect and followed by Florencio Villaluz, Antonio Picazales,Victoriano Evangelio, Modesto Raura and Damian Siano. Again, these town executives were responsible for the expansion of the town to a larger area.

Japanese Era

World War II broke out. A few months later, a strong typhoon hit Hinatuan. Heavy damages inflected to both private and public properties especially to buildings, coconut plantations and other potential crops, forest reserves, and machineries and equipment of the Portlamon Lumber Company. Guerrilla activities then sprung up to lessen the influence and strength of the Armed Forces of the Empire of Japan and to prepare the people for liberation of the country by the allied forces.

Post War

After the war, Elpedio Chavez was appointed mayor of the town. He was later followed by the first-elect, Mayor Tito Cañedo, Sr., under the Republic of the Philippines. He helped much in the rehabilitation and reconstruction of the town. He was followed by Mayor Joaquin Villaluz, Segundo Cuyno, Sr., Candelario Viola, Sr., Jose Pepino, Sr., the mayor under the Martial Law period, LADP scholar Atty. Candelario J. Viola, Jr., Cristina M. Camba, Dr. Alicia V. Momongan and the incumbent Mayor Shem G. Garay.

Geography

Barangays
Hinatuan is politically subdivided into 24 barangays.

Climate

Demographics

Economy

Tourism

Clear blue waters of the underground river in Barangay Talisay, Hinatuan, popularly called as the "Hinatuan Enchanted River" is a known attraction among tourists both locally and internationally.

References

External links

 Hinatuan Profile at PhilAtlas.com
   Hinatuan Profile at the DTI Cities and Municipalities Competitive Index
 [ Philippine Standard Geographic Code]
 Philippine Census Information
 Local Governance Performance Management System

Municipalities of Surigao del Sur